Waninawa, also known as Kamanawa and Panoan Katukína, is a Panoan language of Brazil.

Dialects are Katukina of Olinda, Katukina of Sete Estreles, and the extinct Kanamari (cf. Kanamari) (Fleck 2013).

References

Panoan languages